Jeffersonville is a former train station in Jeffersonville, Indiana. Amtrak's Kentucky Cardinal served Jeffersonville for four years (1999–2003). The platform and shelter sat on the property of the corporate headquarters of the Louisville and Indiana Railroad.

References

External links

Former Amtrak stations in Indiana
Railway stations in the United States opened in 1999
Railway stations closed in 2003
Transportation buildings and structures in Clark County, Indiana
Jeffersonville, Indiana
2003 disestablishments in Indiana
1999 establishments in Indiana